Let's Talk Penn State was an afternoon sports radio program based out of WKPS in State College that featured O. Richard Bundy and Jon Nese.

This program debuted before the 2005 football season in an effort to give students, alumni, and fans an alternative viewpoint from the mainstream media. The idea was that the program would put together two faculty members from completely different disciplines to give their take on university sports happenings.

In its run, the program became renowned for its thorough insight into the ins and outs of university athletics. Instead of focusing just on football, Nese would often highlight more obscure sports in a segment called - "Perfecting the Craft" - in which he looked into sports such as fencing, women's rugby, among others.

Bundy was the Director of the Penn State Blue Band during the show's tenure and Nese is a professor in the College of Earth and Mineral Sciences.

The show's theme song that was played before and after the jump was a rendition of the popular Hartford Whalers theme song Brass Bonanza, a brass tune that had been defunct since the Whalers hockey team moved from Hartford in 1997.

Frequent guests included Senior Women's Administrator Susan Delaney Sheetz, Mike the Mailman, Joe Battista, then Lady Lion's coach Rene Portland, and Kelly Goodman.

Each week, the program was paid a visit from Penn State graduate and current NFL Network personality, Kimberly Jones. In her segment, "Keeping Up with the Jones", Jones provided color commentary alongside Bundy and Nese on the topics of the day. Additionally, the segment would profile Penn State's Center for Sports Journalism and would from time to time provides opportunities for rising students to chime in and share in the day's stories.

The combination of discussion, guests, and cool music made the show popular among listeners in the 1:00PM–3:00PM timeslot, but eventually Nese and Bundy decided to focus on other commitments and new hosts were not found. The program ended after the 2006-2007 schoolyear, with Bundy uttering his signature sign-off "For The Glory" one final time on May 15, 2007.

American sports radio programs